Elliot Sloan (born 29 July 1988) is an American professional skateboarder from New York City.

Early life
Elliot Sloan was born on 29 July 1988 in New York City, New York, and was raised there.

Career
Sloan is a five time X Games medalist, most recently winning gold in the Skateboard Big Air event at the 2019 X Games.

Influences
Sloan cites Tony Hawk as an influence for him to begin skateboarding.

References

External links

 

1988 births
Living people
American skateboarders
X Games athletes
Sportspeople from New York City